William Skeffington (by 152122 September 1571), of Skeffington, Leicestershire, was an English Member of Parliament.

He was the eldest son of Thomas Skeffington of Skeffington and succeeded his father in 1543.

He was a Justice of the Peace for Leicestershire from 1547 to his death and a Commissioner for Relief in 1550. He was elected a Member (MP) of the Parliament of England for Leicestershire in 1555 and was appointed High Sheriff of Warwickshire and Leicestershire for 1560–61.

He married Mary, the daughter of Thomas Cave of Stanford, Northamptonshire; they had 2 sons and 3 daughters. He was succeeded by his eldest son Thomas.

References

Year of birth missing
1571 deaths
People from Harborough District
Members of the Parliament of England for Leicestershire
High Sheriffs of Warwickshire
High Sheriffs of Leicestershire
English MPs 1555
Sheriffs of Warwickshire